The Fourth Abe Cabinet governed Japan under the leadership of Prime Minister Shinzō Abe from November 2017 to September 2020. The government is a coalition between the Liberal Democratic Party and the Komeito (which had changed its name from "New Komeito" in the 2012–2014 term) and controls both the upper and lower houses of the National Diet.

Following his resignation, the Fourth Abe cabinet was dissolved on September 16, 2020, and replaced with the Suga cabinet.

According to research by Nikkan Gendai, 10 out of 20 members in the Fourth Abe Cabinet had connections to the Unification Church,  in Japan by Shinzo Abe's grandfather, former Prime Minister Nobusuke Kishi, Yoshio Kodama and Ryōichi Sasakawa. These connections were largely ignored by Japanese journalists.

Background

Election of the Prime Minister

Lists of Ministers 

R = Member of the House of Representatives
C = Member of the House of Councillors

Cabinet

Changes 
 February 27, 2018 – Okinawa and Northern Territories Minister Tetsuma Esaki resigned and was replaced by Teru Fukui.

First Reshuffled Cabinet

Changes 
 April 10, 2019 – Tokyo Olympic and Paralympic Games Minister Yoshitaka Sakurada resigned and was replaced by Shun'ichi Suzuki.

Second Reshuffled Cabinet

Changes 
 October 25, 2019 – Economy, Trade and Industry Minister Isshu Sugawara resigned and was replaced by Hiroshi Kajiyama.
 October 31, 2019 – Justice Minister Katsuyuki Kawai resigned and was replaced by Masako Mori.

References

External links 
List of Ministers November 2017 – October 2018
List of Ministers October 2018 – September 2019
List of Ministers September 2019 – September 2020

Cabinet of Japan
2017 establishments in Japan
2020 disestablishments in Japan
Cabinets established in 2017
Cabinets disestablished in 2020
2017 in Japanese politics
Shinzo Abe